The Assassination of Harry Barrie occurred in Aden on 29 August 1965 and involved the assassination of the Head of Police, Harry Barrie.

Barrie was driving into a lane leading to his office at the British intelligence centre in the Crater. Seven bullets hit him in the chest, right hand and leg. He died whilst he was being rushed to the nearest hospital. It was the first attack on a British police officer although in the previous eight months five Arab members of the Aden police force had been killed and six wounded.

References

Aden Emergency
1965 murders in Asia
August 1965 events in Asia
1965 in the Federation of South Arabia
Assassinations in Yemen
Assassinated police officers
Aden Governorate
Deaths by firearm in Yemen
British people murdered abroad